Radio Invicta was a pirate radio station that broadcast to London, and was the first of its kind to specialise in playing soul music. It broadcast from December 1970 to July 1984, and was known by its slogan Soul over London and considered itself "Europe's first and only all soul station".

Many of the well known DJs on the soul, funk, and jazz-funk scenes at the time played on the station, including Froggy, Chris Hill, Tony Cleveland, Roger Tate, Andy Jackson, Steve Devonne, Steve Chandler, Tony Johns, and Herbie (Mastermind Roadshow). The station would also launch the careers of Steve Walsh, Gilles Peterson, and Pete Tong.

Having originally broadcast during the week, from 1974-1978 the station broadcast solely on bank holidays. From 1978, it then moved to afternoons/evenings every Sunday.

References

Defunct radio stations in the United Kingdom
Radio stations in London
Pirate radio stations in the United Kingdom
Radio stations established in 1970
Radio stations disestablished in 1984